Homar Rojas Villarreal (born February 16, 1964 in Santiago, Nuevo León, Mexico) is a former player and a manager in Minor League Baseball. He batted and threw right-handed.

Rojas spent 23 years in the minor leagues as a catcher before becoming a manager. From 1982 through 2004, he played for nine different teams both in the Mexican Baseball and Mexican Pacific leagues. A fine defensive catcher and good-contact hitter, he batted .300 or more nine times and hit 150 home runs, while collecting a career .291 batting average. His most productive season came in 1998, when he posted career-highs in average (.352) and RBI (92).

Following his playing career, Rojas has managed both in the LMB (2005–2006) and LMP (2007–08).

Playing career
LMB

Managerial career

 Led the Yaquis to the 2007-08 LMP title for their first pennant in 27 years of franchise history.

References

1964 births
Living people
Albuquerque Dukes players
Bakersfield Dodgers players
Baseball players from Nuevo León
Caribbean Series managers
Guerreros de Oaxaca players
Industriales de Monterrey players
Leones de Yucatán players
Mayos de Navojoa players
Mexican expatriate baseball players in the United States
Mexican League baseball catchers
Mexican League baseball first basemen
Mexican League baseball managers
Minor league baseball managers
People from Santiago, Nuevo León
San Antonio Missions players
Sultanes de Monterrey players
Tigres del México players
Vero Beach Dodgers players
Yaquis de Obregón players